Prof David Thomson (1817–1880) was a 19th-century Scottish physicist. He was known as Davie Thomson or later Auld Dauvit.

Life

He was born on 27 November 1817 the son of David Thomson a merchant in Leghorn in Italy. He was educated in Italy and Switzerland then sent to Glasgow University in 1832. In 1836 he won a place at Trinity College, Cambridge where he gained a BA in 1839 (and was granted MA in 1845).

From 1840 he acted as substitute Professor of Natural Philosophy (Physics) in place of William Meikleham at Glasgow University. His most notable student was William Thomson, Lord Kelvin. In 1845 he got a permanent position at King's College, Aberdeen. In 1854 he became Sub-Principal of the college. When King's and Marischal College merged in 1860 to create the University of Aberdeen he remained as Professor but was no longer Sub Principal. His students included George Slessor and George Pirie.

In 1863 he and a very young David Gill (then a young student) restored the university clock and also set up a fine telescope in the Cromwell Tower Observatory. It was Thomson who introduced Gill to astronomy.

He died in his lodgings at Kings College on 31 January 1880. He is buried in the churchyard of St Machar's Cathedral. The grave lies east of the church.

Publications

Acoustics - article in 9th edition of Encyclopedia Britannica.
Caledonia Romana (1852)

Artistic recognition

A marble bust of Thomson by John Hutchison RSA is held by Aberdeen University.

Family
He was outlived by his wife, one son and three daughters.

At least five of his children died in infancy.

References

1817 births
1880 deaths
People from Livorno
Alumni of the University of Cambridge
Academics of the University of Aberdeen
Scottish physicists